On 4 April 2017,  several Islamic State militants disguised as military personnel killed at least 35 people in Tikrit, 14 of which were members of security forces.

The attacks
The attack occurred late on the night of April 4, when 10 ISIL militants disguised in police uniform attacked a security checkpoint and stormed the house of a police colonel in Zuhour, a neighborhood in Tikrit. The clashes resulted in the killing of at least five IS militants; three were shot dead, while two others detonated their explosive vests, according to a security source.

See also
 List of terrorist incidents in April 2017

References

2017 murders in Iraq
21st-century mass murder in Iraq
April 2017 crimes in Asia
April 2017 events in Iraq
ISIL terrorist incidents in Iraq
Islamic terrorist incidents in 2017
Mass murder in 2017
Mass murder in Iraq
Terrorist incidents in Iraq in 2017
Tikrit